is a Japanese former tennis player. He competed in the Grand Slam singles events five times, losing in the first round each time. He also represented Japan in the Davis Cup in 1962 and 1963, after winning the national championship in 1961 and 1962.

References

1939 births
Living people
People from Hyōgo Prefecture
Sportspeople from Hyōgo Prefecture
Japanese male tennis players
Asian Games medalists in tennis
Tennis players at the 1962 Asian Games
Asian Games gold medalists for Japan
Asian Games silver medalists for Japan
Asian Games bronze medalists for Japan
Medalists at the 1962 Asian Games
20th-century Japanese people